The National Exhibition and Convention Center (Shanghai) (NECC) is an exhibition and convention centre in Shanghai, China. The NECC is currently the largest exhibition complex, making it one of the landmark buildings in Shanghai. The building was co-built by Ministry of Commerce of China and Shanghai Municipal Government.

The center consists of four exhibition halls, the NECC Plaza, office buildings and a hotel. The façade of the NECC building draws inspiration from a "four-leaf clover" with the plaza as the core and the exhibition halls as its leaves.

Located in the Qingpu District in western Shanghai, the NECC enjoys multiple means of transportation provided by the Hongqiao transportation hub, including buses, metro, high-speed railway and airport. Metro Line 2's East Xujing station is the closest metro station to the center.

Entertainment events
28 July 2018 - Kyary Pamyu Pamyu - The Spooky Obakeyashiki: Pumpkins Strike Back
2 February 2019 - Perfume - Perfume WORLD TOUR 4th "FUTURE POP"
16 August 2019 - Westlife - The Twenty Tour
22 June 2019 - Aimer - Aimer “soleil et pluie”Asia Tour

References 

Buildings and structures in Shanghai
Landmarks in Shanghai
Convention and exhibition centers in China